Najas madagascariensis, called the Madagascar water nymph, is an aquatic plant growing in fresh water ponds. It is native known from Madagascar and naturalized on the Island of Mauritius.

References

madagascariensis
Aquatic plants
Flora of Mauritius
Flora of Madagascar
Plants described in 1899